The Gans family is a prominent German family of industrialists and philanthropists from Frankfurt am Main. It is descended from Ludwig Aaron Gans, a Jewish businessman from Celle, who became an apprentice in the firm Caßel & Reiß in Frankfurt in 1814. In 1828, he married Rosette Goldschmidt (1805–1868), a niece and adopted daughter of the firm's owner Leopold Cassella, and was accepted as a partner of the firm. In 1848, Gans became sole owner of Leopold Cassella & Co., as the company was then named. Ludwig Aaron Gans was the father of the major industrialist Friedrich Ludwig von Gans, who was ennobled in 1912, and of the chemist and industrialist Leo Gans. The family converted from Judaism to Protestantism in the late 19th century.

Literature
 Angela von Gans, Monika Groening: Die Familie Gans 1350–1963. Verlag Regionalkultur, Heidelberg, 2006, 
 Monika Groening: Leo Gans und Arthur von Weinberg. Mäzenatentum und jüdische Emanzipation (Biographiereihe der Goethe Universität: Gründer, Gönner und Gelehrte), Societätsverlag Frankfurt  am Main 2012, .

German families
Converts to Protestantism from Judaism
German untitled nobility